Miss Teen USA 2012 was the 30th Miss Teen USA pageant. The pageant was held on July 28, 2012 at the Grand Ballroom of the Atlantis Paradise Island in Nassau, The Bahamas. Danielle Doty of Texas crowned Logan West from Connecticut as the new Miss Teen USA 2012 at the end of the event. The 50 states and the District of Columbia competed for the prestigious title and the pageant was streamed globally on the official Miss Teen USA website over its Ustream channel and was also streamed for the first time to Xbox 360 consoles over Xbox Live in North America and in select regions in Europe, Oceania and Latin America.

Pageant
The top 16 were announced and competed in Swimsuit and Evening Gown. Then, each girl was interviewed backstage by Colin Hornett. Before the final round, each girl in the top five was asked a personal question then a question the judges written for them. West cited when she was 14 years old and starting a program to combat bullying as her greatest accomplishment. Her crowning marks the first time a contestant from Connecticut won the pageant.

Results

Placements

‡ Voted into Top 16 as America's Choice via Internet/SMS Messaging

Special Awards

Historical significance 
 Connecticut wins competition for the first time. Also becoming in the 26th state who wins Miss Teen USA.
 West Virginia earns the 1st runner-up position for the first time.
 Michigan earns the 2nd runner-up position for the second time. The last time it was placed in 2003.
 Oklahoma earns the 3rd runner-up position for the second time. The last time it was placed in 1987.
 Ohio earns the 4th runner-up position for the first time.
 States that placed in semifinals the previous year were Georgia, Kansas, South Carolina and West Virginia.
 Georgia, Kansas, South Carolina and West Virginia made their second consecutive placement.
 Alabama, Illinois, New York, Oklahoma, Utah and Wyoming last placed in 2010.
 Michigan and Ohio last placed in 2009.
 North Carolina last placed in 2008.
 Hawaii and New Mexico last placed in 2007.
 Connecticut last placed in 2002.
 Maryland breaks an ongoing streak of placements since 2009.
 California breaks an ongoing streak of placements since 2008.

Contestants

1 Age at the time of state pageant.

Replacements
Florida - Gracie Simmons was originally Miss Florida Teen USA 2012, but resigned due to unknown reasons. Sydney Martinez, the 1st runner up, replaced her.
Tennessee - Samara Ham was originally Miss Tennessee Teen USA 2012, but resigned due to her friend posting a topless photograph of her. Shanese Brown, the 1st runner up, replaced her.

Availability
Xbox Live's broadcast of the pageant was available in the following countries:

References

External links
 Miss Teen USA official website

2012
2012 in the United States
2012 beauty pageants